The  is an electric multiple unit (EMU) train type operated by the private railway operator Nishi-Nippon Railroad (Nishitetsu) in Japan since 2006.

Formations

The trains are formed as two-car, three-car, and five-car formations. , the fleet consists of six two-car sets, six three-car sets, and four five-car sets (50 vehicles in total), formed as shown below.

Two-car sets

The Mc car has two single-arm pantographs.

Three-car sets

The M car has two single-arm pantographs.

Five-car sets

The M1 and M2 cars each have two single-arm pantographs.

Interior
Passenger accommodation consists of transverse 2+2 abreast seating with seat backs that can be flipped over to face the direction of travel.

History
Introduced in 2006, the 3000 series was the first stainless steel bodied design introduced by Nishitetsu.

A further two two-car sets (3119 and 3120) were delivered in January 2016.

References

External links

 Nishitetsu 3000 series information 

Electric multiple units of Japan
Nishi-Nippon Railroad
1500 V DC multiple units of Japan
Kawasaki multiple units